The Shikishima is the  lead ship of  of the Japan Coast Guard (JCG). She was built by Ishikawajima-Harima Heavy Industries, Tokyo.

Planned to guard plutonium transport ships, the Shikishima class is the largest and heaviest-equipped patrol vessel of the JCG. With her cruising capacity, she can make voyages from Japan to Europe without making any calls.

She is the only JCG ship  equipped with anti-air radar and Oerlikon 35 mm twin cannons, so she has increased anti-air firepower. Usually, PL (Patrol vessels, Large) have only a navigation radar and a single-mounted 35 mm or 40 mm autocannon. And the JM61 20 mm Vulcan on the single-mounted remote weapon system later became a model for the 20 mm RFS (Remote Firing System), which is on modern PMs and PSs such as the  PS. The OPS-14 2D air search radar is the Japanese counterpart of the American AN/SPS-49.

At present, she is frequently sent on long cruises to Southeast Asia to foster international cooperation against piracy in the Strait of Malacca. She is also assigned to the policing mission of Senkaku Islands because of her cruising capacity. There are plans for more ships of this design to be constructed.

References

External links

 PLH31しきしま（2004年版海上保安リポート資料編）
 （1/30スケール(全長5m) ラジコン しきしま） 

Shikishima-class patrol vessels
1991 ships
Ships built by IHI Corporation